Edgar Innes Fripp (27 November 1861 – 9 November 1931) was a Unitarian minister and English antiquarian who specialized in Shakespearean research in the archives of Stratford-upon-Avon, and the father of the artist Paul Fripp.

Life 

Born in London to George Arthur Fripp (1813–1896) and Mary Fripp, nee Percival (1825–1887). Fripp graduated from Manchester College, Oxford, and served as a Unitarian minister from 1887 to 1924.

He died on 9 Nov 1931 in Colchester, Essex, and was buried on 12 Nov 1931 in Stratford upon Avon, Warwickshire.

Family 

Fripp married Edith Caroline Morley on 16 Apr 1889, and they had four children. She died 28 Jan 1945 in Mitford, Northumberland, and is buried with her husband in Stratford.

Major works 

The composition of the book of Genesis. (1892)

Minutes and accounts of the corporation of Stratford-upon-Avon and other records, 1553–1566. Vol 1. (1921) With Richard Savage. Dugdale Society.

Minutes and accounts of the corporation of Stratford-upon-Avon and other records, 1566–1577. Vol 2. (1924) With Richard Savage. Dugdale Society.

Master Richard Quyny: Bailiff of Stratford-upon-Avon and friend of William Shakespeare. (1924) Oxford UP.

Minutes and accounts of the corporation of Stratford-upon-Avon and other records, 1577–1586. Vol 3. (1926) With Richard Savage. Dugdale Society.

Shakespeare's Stratford. (1928) Oxford UP.

Minutes and accounts of the corporation of Stratford-upon-Avon and other records, 1586–1592. Vol. 4 (1929). With Richard Savage. Dugdale Society.

Shakespeare's haunts near Stratford. (1929) Oxford UP.

Shakespeare Studies, biographical and literary. (1930)

Shakespeare, man and artist. Frederick Christian Wellstood, ed. 2 vols. (1938)  Oxford UP

References

External links

Wilson, James Southall. Shakespeare and His Friends. Review of Shakespeare: Man and Artist. 1938. Virginia Quarterly Review 14: 4 (Autumn 1938), pp. 637–640. Accessed 16 March 2011.
 
 Video about lecture written by E.I. Fripp archived in the Shakespeare Birthplace Trust library.

1861 births
1931 deaths
English Unitarians
English antiquarians
Shakespearean scholars
English biographers
Irish non-subscribing Presbyterian ministers